Bremnes Church is a parish church of the Church of Norway in Bømlo Municipality in Vestland county, Norway. It is located in the village of Svortland on the island of Bømlo. It is the church for the Bremnes parish which is part of the Sunnhordland prosti (deanery) in the Diocese of Bjørgvin. The white, wooden church was built in a long church design in 1869 using plans drawn up by the architect Jacob Wilhelm Nordan. The church seats about 750 people.

History
The earliest existing historical records of the church date back to the year 1327, but it was considered an old church at that time. The first church here was a wooden stave church that was located in the nearby farm area of Gåsland (across the lake from the present location). This church was likely built during the 13th century. Historically, the church was called Gåsland Church (spelled Gaasland) since it was located on that farm. In 1689, the stave church was demolished  and a new wooden long church was built in the same place by the builder Oluff Bysemb.

In 1852, the municipal council began discussing the idea of replacing this church with a new building. This discussion led to a dispute as to where the church should be located. After the choice of plot was decided in 1864, the architect Jacob Wilhelm Nordan was commissioned to prepare drawings for the new church. In 1867, modified drawings were approved and the lead builder Ole Vangberg was hired to lead the construction work. The church was built during 1869 and it was consecrated on 16 September 1869. Ahead of the 100th anniversary in 1969, a major remodeling and repair of the building was carried out according to plans prepared by architect Ole Halvorsen from Bergen. During this project, the choir, the sacristies, and the church porch were all enlarged. Work began in May 1965 and ended in August 1966.

See also
List of churches in Bjørgvin

References

Bømlo
Churches in Vestland
Long churches in Norway
Wooden churches in Norway
19th-century Church of Norway church buildings
Churches completed in 1869
13th-century establishments in Norway